Greatest Hits is a greatest hits album by Grand Funk Railroad, released in 2006.

Track listing
All songs written and composed by Mark Farner except where noted.
"We're an American Band" (Don Brewer) – 3:26
"Time Machine" – 3:45
"Walk Like a Man" (Brewer/Farner) – 4:05
"Some Kind of Wonderful" (John Ellison) – 3:23
"Shinin' On" (Brewer/Farner) – 5:56
"Heartbreaker" – 6:34
"Rock & Roll Soul" – 3:29
"The Loco-Motion" (Gerry Goffin/Carole King) – 2:46
"Footstompin' Music" – 3:46
"Mean Mistreater" (Live) – 4:56
"Take Me"   (Brewer/Craig Frost) – 5:06
"Bad Time" – 2:56
"I'm Your Captain" – 9:59
"Inside Looking Out" (Eric Burdon/Chas Chandler) – 9:31

References

2006 greatest hits albums
Capitol Records compilation albums
Grand Funk Railroad compilation albums